Hasan Pasha or Hassan Pasha may refer to:

 Hasan Pasha (son of Barbarossa) (c. 1517–1572), Ottoman governor of Algiers
 Hasan Pasha of Temeşvar ( 1594), Ottoman governor of Temeşvar
 Hasan Pasha (Mamluk) (ruled 1704–1723), first ruler of the Mamluk dynasty of Iraq
 Hasan Fehmi Pasha (1836–1910), Ottoman statesmen
 Hasan Rami Pasha (1842–1923), Ottoman admiral and naval minister
 Hasan Tahsin Pasha (1845–1918), Ottoman military officer
 Hasan Enver Pasha (1857–1928), Ottoman soldier
 Hasan Rıza Pasha (1871–1913), Ottoman general
 Hasan Izzet Pasha (1871–1931), Ottoman general
 Hassan Sabry Pasha (1879–1940), Egyptian politician
 Hasan Raza Pasha ( 2007), Pakistani lawyer

See also
 Telli Hasan Pasha (1530–1593), Ottoman governor of Bosnia
 Yemişçi Hasan Pasha (1535–1603), Ottoman Grand Vizier
 Abaza Hasan Pasha (died 1659), Ottoman governor and leader of several major rebellions
 Mollacık Hasan Pasha (died 1700), Ottoman warden of Rhodes and governor of Egypt, Baghdad, and Shahrizor
 Damat Hasan Pasha (1658–1713), Ottoman Grand Vizier and governor of Egypt
 Macar Hacı Hasan Pasha (died 1768), Ottoman Kapudan Pasha and governor of Egypt
 Cezayirli Gazi Hasan Pasha (1713–1790), Ottoman captain, Kapudan Pasha and grand vizier
 Cenaze Hasan Pasha (died 1810), Ottoman grand vizier
 Hasanpaşa (disambiguation)